Santa Catarina do Fogo is a concelho (municipality) of Cape Verde. Situated in the southeastern part of the island of Fogo, it covers 32% of the island area (152.95 km2), and is home to 14% of its population (5,299 at the 2010 census). Its seat is the city Cova Figueira. The Municipality of Santa Catarina do Fogo was created in 2005; before 2005, it was a parish of the Municipality of São Filipe.

Subdivisions
The municipality consists of one freguesia (civil parish), Santa Catarina do Fogo. The freguesia is subdivided into the following settlements, its population was of the 2010 census:

Achada Furna (pop: 495)
Achada Poio (pop: 61)
Baluarte
Cabeça Fundão (pop: 177)
Chã das Caldeiras (pop: 697)
Cova Figueira (pop: 1,230, city)
Domingo Lobo (pop: 254)
Estância Roque (pop: 411)
Figueira Pavão (pop: 320)
Fonte Aleixo (pop: 401)
Mãe Joana (pop: 130)
Monte Vermelho (pop: 221)
Roçadas (pop: 372)
Tinteira (pop: 410)

Geography
The municipality of Santa Catarina do Fogo covers the central and southeastern part of the island Fogo. The northwestern part of the municipality lies within Fogo Natural Park, which includes the Pico do Fogo and its crater.

Demography

Politics
Since 2016, the Movement for Democracy (MpD) is the ruling party of the municipality. The results of the latest elections, in 2016:

Twin towns

Santa Catarina do Fogo is twinned with two Portuguese municipalities:

 Miranda do Corvo
 Vila Nova da Barquinha

External links
 ANMCV (National Association of the Capeverdean Municipalities)
 Municipality of Santa Catarina do Fogo: Municipal Director Plan: Characterization and Diagnostics (March 2010), 120 pages

References

 
Municipalities of Cape Verde
Geography of Fogo, Cape Verde